David Eugene Fellhauer (born August 19, 1939) is an American prelate of the Roman Catholic Church, serving as bishop of the  Diocese of Victoria in Texas from 1990 to 2015.

Biography

Early life 
David Fellhauer was born on August 13, 1939, in Kansas City, Missouri, to Harold E. and Helen R. Francis Fellhauer.  He attended primary school at St. Agnes School in Roeland Park, Kansas, then went to Pontifical College Josephinum in Columbus, Ohio, for high school, college and seminary training.

Priesthood 
On May 29, 1965. Fellhauer was ordained to the priesthood by Cardinal Egidio Vagnozzi for the Diocese of Dallas-Fort Worth. In 1979, Fellhauer obtained his Doctor of Canon Law degree from Saint Paul University in Ottawa, Ontario.

In 1975, Fellhauer was named as assistant judicial vicar (vice-officialis), for the diocese.  He was appointed as judicial vicar in 1979, a role he would fulfill until his appointment as bishop in 1990.

Bishop of Victoria 
On April 19, 1990, Pope John Paul II appointed Fellhauer as the second bishop of the Diocese of Victoria. He received his episcopal consecration at Our Lady of Victory Cathedral in Victoria on May 28 from Archbishop Patrick Flores, with Bishops Thomas Tschoepe and Charles Grahmann serving as co-consecrators.

On August 9, 1994, The Dallas Morning News reported that in 1984 Fellhauer, then serving as judicial vicar, agreed to accept Robert Peebles Jr as a parish priest in the Diocese of Dallas-Fort Worth.  This was despite the knowledge that Peebles had been dishonorably discharged from the US Army for sexually abusing an altar boy while serving as an Army chaplain.Peebles abused three more children in the diocese before being laicized in 1989.  When asked to comment about the article in 1994, Fellhauer said: "We made the best decision at the time in view of the circumstances."

Within the United States Conference of Catholic Bishops, Fellhauer chaired the Committee on Canonical Affairs.  In 1998, Fellhauer received the Role of Law award from the Canon Law Society of America.

Retirement 
When Fellhauer reached the mandatory retirement age of 75 for bishops, he sent his letter of resignation to Pope Francis.  The pope accepted it on April 23, 2015.

See also
 

 Catholic Church hierarchy
 Catholic Church in the United States
 Historical list of the Catholic bishops of the United States
 List of Catholic bishops of the United States
 Lists of patriarchs, archbishops, and bishops

References

External links
Diocese of Victoria, Texas
Catholic-Hierarchy
Bishops of Texas

Episcopal succession

1939 births
Living people
People from Kansas City, Missouri
20th-century Roman Catholic bishops in the United States
21st-century Roman Catholic bishops in the United States
Roman Catholic bishops of Victoria in Texas
Catholics from Missouri